Kexbrough is a village in the Metropolitan Borough of Barnsley (part of South Yorkshire, England), on the border with West Yorkshire. The village falls within the Darton West ward of Barnsley MBC. Historically the village was known as Kexborough, and includes the hamlets of Haigh and Swithin.

History 
Kexbrough is mentioned in the Domesday Book as belonging to Ilbert of Lacey, and having two villagers, a meadow, ploughlands and six furlongs of woodland. Historically in the parish of Darton and the wapentake of Staincross, the village is recorded in the Domesday Book as Chizeburg, being Kesseburgh in the 14th century, and Kexbrough by the 1580s. The place name is derived from a combination of a personal name, and burh, which meant a fortified place.

Transport 
Kexbrough is served by local and Express buses to Barnsley Interchange via Baurgh Green or Mapplewell as well as longer distance services to Wakefield and Leeds. Bus companies that operate in Kexbrough are Stagecoach and Globe Coaches.  Bus routes are 93,93a,95,95a,96,96a and X10. The nearest railway station is Darton railway station on the Hallam Line.  Kexbrough lies directly to the west of Darton and is connected by the A637 road, to the M1 at Junction 38.

Education
Kexbrough has two schools, Darton Academy, and Kexbrough Primary School.

See also
Listed buildings in Darton

References

Geography of the Metropolitan Borough of Barnsley
Villages in South Yorkshire